Yalingimba Airport  is an airstrip serving the community of Yalingimba in Mongala Province, Democratic Republic of the Congo.

See also

Transport in the Democratic Republic of the Congo
List of airports in the Democratic Republic of the Congo

References

External links
 OpenStreetMap - Yalingimba Airport
 Bing Maps - Yalingimba
 OurAirports - Yalingimba Airport
 FallingRain - Yalingimba Airport
 

Airports in Mongala